The Calm Before the Storm: Part 1 is the debut studio album by American rapper Tech N9ne. It was released on November 9, 1999. The track "Questions" also appeared on the soundtrack for the film "Gang Related".

On May 14, 2015, Tech N9ne announced that the title of his Seventeenth album will be The Storm, follow up to his debut album The Calm Before The Storm.

Track listing

Samples
Now It's On
"Moments in Love" by Art of Noise

Credits
Artwork By [Artwork + Design] – Brion Dennis / Madwerks Graphics & Design
Executive Producer – Boss Hoss, Don Juan
Other [A&R, Project Co-ordinator] – Don Juan
Other [Management] – Don Juan & Raychelle Banks / Mizery Entertainment
Distributed by: Mizery Records
Recorded at:
Don Juan – *MidWestSide Studios, K.C., MO.
QDIII – *QDIII Soundlab, L.A., CA.
Kev – *BBC Studios, K.C., MO.
DJ Style – *Lock And Load, Lawrences, KS

References

1999 debut albums
Tech N9ne albums
Gangsta rap albums by American artists